Goniothalamus simonsii is a species of plant in the Annonaceae family. It is endemic to Meghalaya in India.

References

simonsii
Flora of Meghalaya
Endangered plants
Taxonomy articles created by Polbot
Taxa named by Joseph Dalton Hooker
Taxa named by Thomas Thomson (botanist)